Denis Sugrue (11 March 1927 – 23 July 2014) was an Irish rower. He competed in the men's eight event at the 1948 Summer Olympics.

References

1927 births
2014 deaths
Irish male rowers
Olympic rowers of Ireland
Rowers at the 1948 Summer Olympics
Sportspeople from Dublin (city)